The  2013 Moscow psychiatric hospital fire occurred on 26 April 2013 at 2:30 am Moscow Time (22:30 UTC). At least 38 people were killed, included 36 patients and two doctors after fires tore through a psychiatric hospital outside Moscow in the village of Ramensky, 70 miles north of Moscow in Moscow Oblast on April 26, 2013. 29 people were burned alive, killing some patients in their beds and others who were trapped by barred windows. Only 3 people survived, including 2 patients and a nurse.

Fire
On April 26th, 2013, at 2:30 Moscow Time (22:30 UTC), a fire erupted in a psychiatric hospital located in Ramensky, a village in the Dmitrovsky District of Moscow Oblast in European Russia. The facility, which is situated approximately 70 miles north of Moscow, was a two-story building where the fire started in a patient's bed on the second floor. Three doctors and one nurse who rushed to assist the patient were burned alive immediately. The blaze quickly spread throughout the second floor, killing all its occupants. Six minutes after the fire began, the second floor collapsed onto the ground floor, killing patients on the lower level. The fire services arrived on the scene four minutes later and battled the blaze for the next three hours until it was finally extinguished. In the aftermath, the firefighters searched for survivors but were only able to rescue three injured individuals - a nurse on the first floor and two patients on the ground floor. The source of the fire was determined to be from a patient's bed. It is speculated that it was caused by a patient's schizophrenia.

References

2013 fires in Europe
2013 disasters in Russia
2013 in Moscow
Disability in Russia
2013
April 2013 events in Russia
Hospital fires